Periya Kodiveri is a panchayat town in Gobichettipalayam taluk in Erode District of Tamil Nadu state, India. It is about 16 km from Gobichettipalayam and 54 km from district headquarters Erode. The panchayat town is located State Highway 15 connecting Gobichettipalayam and Sathyamangalam. Periyakodiveri has population of 12,330 of which 6,181 are males while 6,149 are females as per 2011 census. Kodiveri Dam, a major tourist attraction is located on the outskirts of the town.

References

Villages in Erode district